Élie Beauregard,  (July 8, 1884 – August 27, 1954) was a Canadian lawyer and politician.

Born in La Patrie, Quebec, he studied law and was admitted to the Bar of Quebec in 1909. Active in the Liberal Party of Canada in Quebec, he was called to the Senate of Canada in 1940 representing the senatorial division of Rougemont, Quebec. He died in office in 1954. From 1949 to 1953, he was the Speaker of the Senate of Canada.

References

External links
 

1884 births
1954 deaths
Canadian senators from Quebec
Liberal Party of Canada senators
Members of the King's Privy Council for Canada
Speakers of the Senate of Canada